Lon is a genus of skipper butterflies (family Hesperiidae) found in North and South America. The genus was erected in 2019 by Nick V. Grishin. The name derives from the last syllable of the type species name.

Species
, the genus includes 10 species:
Lon zabulon (Boisduval and Le Conte, 1837) – Zabulon skipper, type species
Lon hobomok (T. Harris, 1862) – Hobomok skipper
Lon inimica (Butler and Druce, 1872) – yellow-stained skipper
Lon taxiles (Edwards, 1881) – golden skipper
Lon azin (Godman, 1900)
Lon macneilli (Burns, 1992) – Macneill's skipper
Lon ulphila (Plötz, 1883) – ulphila skipper
Lon monticola (Godman, 1900) – oyamel skipper
Lon niveolimbus (Mabille, 1889) – snow-fringed skipper
Lon melane (Edwards, 1869) – umber skipper

References

Hesperiinae
Hesperiidae genera